GJ 3470 is a red dwarf star located in the constellation of Cancer, 30 parsecs away from Earth.

Properties
The star has a mass of 0.539 solar masses and a radius of 0.547 solar radii. It is 1.6 billion years old, with a metallicity of 0.2 Fe/H. The star exhibits a strong stellar activity, with three ultraviolet flares detected by 2021.

Planetary system
At least one exoplanet has been discovered orbiting at the distance of 0.031 astronomical units. The exoplanet, which is called GJ 3470 b, is a mini-Neptune with an orbital period of 3.3 days.

In July 2020, a group of amateur astronomers reported a new exoplanet candidate, which they hypothesize to be the size of Saturn and inside the system's habitable zone, along with twelve tentative transits from not yet characterized exoplanets in the same star system. If confirmed, GJ 3470 c would become the second exoplanet discovered by amateur astronomers, after KPS-1b, an exoplanet discovered by Ural State Technical University using amateur data. The new GJ 3470 candidate was discovered with amateur data and through a project led by amateur astronomers.
 However, it is important to note that the study in question has not been published in any scientific journal, nor has it been peer reviewed.

In August 2022, this planetary system was included among 20 systems to be named by the third NameExoWorlds project.

See also 
GJ 3470 b

References 

Cancer (constellation)
M-type main-sequence stars
03470
Planetary systems with one confirmed planet